Orlando W. Paden (born June 5, 1984) is an American politician serving as a member of the Mississippi House of Representatives from the 26th district. He assumed office on January 5, 2016.

Early life and education 
Paden was born in Clarksdale, Mississippi. He earned an Associate of Arts and Sciences in social sciences from Coahoma Community College and a Bachelor of Arts in political science from Alcorn State University.

Career 
Since 2007, Paden has worked as a Federal Work-Study Program coordinator at Coahoma Community College. He was elected to the Mississippi House of Representatives and assumed office on January 5, 2016.

References 

Living people
1984 births
People from Clarksdale, Mississippi
Coahoma Community College alumni
Alcorn State University alumni
Democratic Party members of the Mississippi House of Representatives